Red Gold is an EP by the experimental rock band Red Krayola, released in 2006 by Drag City.

Critical reception
Perfect Sound Forever called the album "a hoot," writing that "it's as accessible as any RK record, which is to say, the music's incredibly catchy once you've listened to it five times." Tiny Mix Tapes called it "a curiosity that, while highly uneven, is worth seeking out if for no other reason than its sheer eccentricity."

Track listing

Personnel 
Red Krayola
John McEntire – drums, synthesizer, ukulele, mixing, recording
Stephen Prina – guitar, harpsichord, piano, organ, tambourine, vocals
Mayo Thompson – vocals, guitar
Tom Watson – bass guitar, guitar, harpsichord, synthesizer, vocals

Additional musicians and production
Charlie Abel – accordion
Drag City – production
Noel Kupersmith – bass guitar, photography
Roger Seibel – mastering

References 

2000 EPs
Drag City (record label) EPs
Red Krayola albums
Experimental rock EPs